Arthur Dupont (born 1985) is a French actor. He was born in Saint-Mandé, Val-de-Marne, France.

Career 
In 2006, he starred in Chacun sa nuit (One to another) directed by Jean Marc Barr, alongside Lizzie Brocheré and Karl E. Landler

Theatre

Filmography

External links
 

1985 births
French male film actors
Living people
21st-century French male actors
People from Saint-Mandé